The Wolf Among Us 2 is an upcoming episodic graphic adventure game being developed and published by Telltale Games with the assistance of AdHoc Studio, a studio that consists of former Telltale staff. It is a sequel to the 2013 game The Wolf Among Us, with the title taking place six months following the events of the previous title.

Development
When The Wolf Among Us was completed by July 2014, Telltale Games had thought of doing a second season, but they had already committed to the projects leading to Tales from the Borderlands, Minecraft: Story Mode, and Game of Thrones. The company was aware of a strong interest in a second season through the intervening years, and they were looking for the right time to develop it.

A second yet-to-be-named season was announced during the July 2017 San Diego Comic Con and was originally set to premiere in 2018 for personal computers, consoles, and mobile devices. Both Adam Harrington and Erin Yvette were to return to voice Bigby Wolf and Snow White, respectively. Stauffer said that Season Two would not resolve the apparent cliffhanger related to Nerissa's connection to Faith; he said that it was meant to be ending similar to a film noir work that made the viewer think about the implications, but never saw this themselves as a cliffhanger. Instead, Season 2 would have continued on with more narrative related to Bigby and Snow White.
By May 2018, Telltale announced that due to recent internal studio issues, they had to push back the release of the sequel until 2019. In September 2018, Telltale had a majority studio closure due to "insurmountable challenges", cancelling The Wolf Among Us second season among other projects in development.

Upon Telltale's revival by LCG Entertainment, The Wolf Among Us was one of the titles reacquired by LCG, but no announcement was made at that time about the sequel. The company announced The Wolf Among Us 2 at The Game Awards 2019. The sequel will continue events after the first game, though still remain as a prequel to the comic series. The game is being developed in association with AdHoc Studio, formed by former Telltale Games staff, who will focus on the game's narrative and cinematic elements while Telltale will implement the gameplay and other designs. In addition to returning Telltale staff, Harrington and Yvette will return to voice Bigby and Snow White, and Jared Emerson-Johnson will compose music for the game. The game was being developed on the Unreal Engine 4 before it was upgraded to Unreal Engine 5 during 2023, and will be released in an episodic approach. This sequel will be worked completely from scratch, using none of the ideas and initial work that had been done under the former Telltale banner before its closure. Unlike the past development cycle approach at the former Telltale where each episode was developed in a standalone fashion, all episodes of The Wolf Among Us 2 are being developed simultaneously. The game was set to be released in 2023, but on March 1, 2023, Telltale announced the game would be delayed to 2024. The development team decided that switching to Unreal Engine 5 would be "worth the effort" of redoing much of the work that was already done on Unreal Engine 4 due to the abundance of features in a newer version of the engine, the delay decision was made to avoid doing crunch during this switch.

References

External links
 

Upcoming video games scheduled for 2024
Detective video games
Episodic video games
Fables (comics)
Interactive movie video games
Mystery video games
Neo-noir video games
MacOS games
Point-and-click adventure games
Single-player video games
Telltale Games games
Unreal Engine games
Video games with cel-shaded animation
Video games based on DC Comics
Video games developed in the United States
Video games scored by Jared Emerson-Johnson
Video game sequels
Video games set in 1986
Video games set in New York City
Video games about police officers
Werewolf video games
Windows games